Hoo is a surname. The most common origin for the contemporary surname is that it is an alternate spelling of Hu (surname). Notable people with the surname include:

Hoo Ah Kay (1816–1880), Singaporean businessman
Alan Hoo (born 1951), Hong Kong barrister
Hoo Cha-pen (1924–2004), Taiwanese basketball coach
Hoo Cher Mou, Singaporean air force general and chief 
Geri Hoo (1939–2007), actress, 1958 Miss Universe contestant as a representative of Hawaii
Hoo Kam Chiu (1910–?), Hong Kong sport shooter
Hoo Pang Ron (born 1998), Malaysian badminton player
Vivian Hoo Kah Mun (born 1990), Malaysian badminton player
Hoo Yee Fan (born 1994), Chinese chess prodigy
Hōō Tomomichi (1956–2013), Japanese sumo wrestler
Iso Hoo (born Carl Henrik Rosenberg, 1979), Finnish rapper
Thomas Hoo, Baron Hoo and Hastings (died 1455), member of the ancient "Hoo" or "de Hoo" family of England

See also
Hu (surname)